Petra Mandula and Barbara Schett were the defending champions, but both players retired from professional tennis during this year. Mandula played her last match at the first round of the French Open against Anabel Medina Garrigues, while Schett retired at the Australian Open following her second-round defeat against Daniela Hantuchová.

Émilie Loit and Katarina Srebotnik won the title by defeating Lourdes Domínguez Lino and Marta Marrero 6–1, 3–6, 6–2 in the final.

Seeds

Draw

Draw

References

External links
 Official results archive (ITF)
 Official results archive (WTA)

Tippmix Budapest Grand Prix - Doubles
Budapest Grand Prix